The Utah Telecommunication Open Infrastructure Agency (UTOPIA) is a consortium of 16 Utah cities engaged in deploying and operating a fiber to the premises network to every business and household (about 160,000) within its footprint. Using an active Ethernet infrastructure and operating at the wholesale level, UTOPIA is considered an open-access network and promotes competition in all telecommunications services.

History 

2002 First feasibility study 
2004 authorization of first bonds
2007 falls short of subscriber goal of 35%, reaching only 16% subscribership to service. 
2014 proposal for a private equity firm purchase, which fails to go through
2015 approached net zero operational cost, which would end years of operational losses subsidized by member cities.

Operations 

UTOPIA operates as a wholesale fiber-optic network and is prohibited by law from providing retail services. There are currently 17 service providers on the UTOPIA network and the network is open to additional service providers that meet certain qualifications. Though UTOPIA has extended an open invitation to Comcast, CenturyLink (formerly Qwest), and Frontier Communications, the incumbent service providers, all have declined to join the network.

Financing 

UTOPIA bonds for construction costs using sales tax pledges as collateral to secure the bond. Revenues to cover the bonds are then set aside by pledging cities in an interest-bearing account and will only be used should subscriber revenues fail to cover the debt service. Because UTOPIA cities all bond at the same time and use their collective bond ratings and taxing authority, financing is generally seen as low-risk and secures a low interest rate.

UTOPIA encountered financial problems in late 2007 and halted all new construction. They have applied for and been approved for loans from the US Department of Agriculture's Rural Utilities Service (RUS) program. These loans required UTOPIA to submit a construction plan for approval and, once approved, apply for reimbursement. UTOPIA reportedly ran into multiple delays in seeking reimbursement before being outright refused any further reimbursement from RUS without explanation. At the time, UTOPIA had $11M in outstanding construction costs that had not been reimbursed by RUS. UTOPIA has since sued RUS for damages.

Because of these problems, UTOPIA asked its pledging member cities to extend the bonding period from 20 to 30 years and bond for additional to connect additional customers, complete unfinished sections of the network, and provide two years of capitalized interest payments. The new bond is for $185M with a total cost including interest of $500M. The network has over 11,000 subscribers.

A new proposal in 2014 has surfaced from an Australian investment company called Macquarie Group. By June 27, 2014 eleven of the cities will need to decide to move forward with a proposed plan to incorporate the expense of construction costs as a mandatory utility fee or not. The proposed fees would range from about $18-25 more per month for everyone in those cities. Regardless, the cities still retain this debt, and if the plan was voted down, then each of those cities would have to raise city taxes/fees in order to pay off the loans.

Utah Infrastructure Agency 

The Utah Infrastructure Agency (UIA) is an interlocal agency formed in June 2010 with 9 of the 11 original UTOPIA pledging member cities. UIA is a funding mechanism to finance new build areas for new customers. Beginning with the deployment in Brigham City in 2009, UTOPIA began a ftth ownership-like model of installation to the subscriber. This is either done as a lump-sum payment of $2,750 or financed over 10 or 20 years. The UIA provides a way to finance payments using bonds backed by subscribers and issued by the participating cities. The payment is around $25/mo on the 20-year plan or $30/mo and $300 down for a 10-year option. They have also introduced a lease option which requires a 1-year commitment for $30 a month (goes to Month-to-Month billing after the period is up). UIA previously offered a 2-year lease instead. Even though leasing does not lead to owning the fiber portal as a house utility in the future, it has been wildly successful due to the low commitment. These financing options only cover the cost of the network connection and service is billed separately (around $35/mo for 250Mbit/s or $50- 65 for 1Gbit/s symmetrical service as of May 2017).

UTOPIA Fiber cities 

Utopia is available in at least parts of the following cities: 

Brigham City
Centerville
Clearfield
Layton
Lindon
Midvale
Morgan
Murray
Orem
Payson 
Perry
Pleasant Grove
Syracuse, Utah
Tremonton
West Point City
West Valley City
Woodland Hills

Types of service 

The types of service provided depend on the service provider. UTOPIA itself doesn't set any requirements on the services offered.

VOIP (Phone)
IPTV (Video)
Data (Internet)

Service providers

Network management/design 
UTOPIA's network design is handled by UTOPIA's Network Engineers.

References

External links 
 

Fiber-optic communications
Communications in Utah